Horticultural therapy (also known as garden therapy or social and therapeutic horticulture or STH) is defined by the American Horticultural Therapy Association (AHTA) as the engagement of a person in gardening and plant-based activities, facilitated by a trained therapist, to achieve specific therapeutic treatment goals. Direct contact with plants is believed to  guide a person's focus away from stress enhancing their overall quality of life. The AHTA believes that horticultural therapy is an active process which occurs in the context of an established treatment plan. Horticultural therapists are specially educated and trained members of rehabilitation teams (with doctors, psychiatrists, psychologists, occupational therapists and others) who involve the client in all phases of gardening,  from propagation to selling products, as a means of bringing about improvement in their life.

History
The use of horticulture to calm the senses dates as far back as 2000 BC in ancient Mesopotamia, and around 500 BC, ancient Persians created gardens to soothe the senses by involving beauty, fragrance, flowing water, and cool temperatures. According to the American Horticultural Therapy Association, Ancient Egyptian physicians prescribed walks around a garden for patients with mental illness; which makes the first sign of the therapeutic process in Alexandria and Ancient Egypt through Renaissance Europe. During the Middle Ages, on the grounds of a monastery hospital, plants were used to express purpose of cheering up melancholy patients. Also, the gardens were used to treat both physical and mental ailments of sickness who visited them. The first modern documentation of horticulture being used as a treatment for mental health purposes was in the 1800s.  Dr. Benjamin Rush was the first to suggest that field labor in a farm setting helped attain positive outcomes for clients with mental illness This discovery lead many hospitals in the western world to begin using horticulture as a means to start therapeutically treating patients with mental health and developmental disabilities. In 1817, the Asylum for Persons Deprived of Their Reason, now known as Friends Hospital, constructed an environment with landscaping, paths and a park atmosphere in effort to assist patients in their recovery. In 1879 Friends Hospital built the first greenhouse that was used for therapy.  Post World War 1 horticultural therapy was used to help servicemen rehabilitate, in the 1940s garden club members brought garden activities to the servicemen and in 1960 the first published book on horticultural therapy was written. The first degree in horticultural therapy was established in 1972.

In 1973 the Council for Therapy and Rehabilitation through Horticulture (NCTRH) was established by a group of horticulture therapy professionals. In 1988, they changed their name to the American Horticulture Therapy Association (AHTA) which they are still called today. AHTA is a non-profit organization with about 25% off their members being professionally registered.

Today, horticultural therapy is practiced in many countries and area in the world, such as in Japan, Korea, Hong Kong, the United Kingdom, Germany, Italy, India and Sweden. Many universities in these countries have education programs and research in horticultural therapy. Special laboratories have also been built, such as Alnarp Rehabilitation Garden at the Swedish University of Agricultural Sciences campus area in Alnarp.

Types of Treatment 
Goals and types of treatment vary depending on the facility using horticultural therapy. Institutions from schools and nursing homes to prisons utilize horticultural therapy to meet therapeutic needs. Each one of these facilities have different types of horticultural therapy, each with their own individual forms of treatment. Fundamentally horticultural therapy can be divided into three types of programming: Vocational, therapeutic, and social.

Vocational Horticultural Therapy 
Vocational Horticultural Therapy is intended to teach skill and enhance behaviors that can be used in a job or workplace. People undergoing vocational therapy can learn skills involving greenhouses, vegetable gardening, tree and shrub care , as well as learn about plant production, sales and services.  Activities vocational therapy teaches consists of how to repot, water, and move plants within their space. Learning the basic knowledge of their plants root system and the care different plants need is taught at their own pace. Ultimately aimed at employment, vocational horticulture therapy teaches people how to grow and work with plants while also learning the benefits of supporting themselves mentally and financially.

Therapeutic Horticultural Therapy 
Therapeutic Horticultural Therapy has its focus on medical and illness recovery. The central belief that therapeutic horticulture therapy revolves around is that being in nature has restorative properties[3]. Therapeutic horticulture might be used to try and  improve physical activity, social skills and engagement. Activities encompassed by therapeutic horticulture vary widely, some activities include: repetitive actions such as digging and watering, making observations about plant growth and change, relating plant life cycle to human life, and starting seeds. It has been suggested that things such as new growth on their plants can excite the caretaker, building up their confidence and increasing enthusiasm towards horticultural activities. The impact that therapeutic horticulture has on both mind and body, as well as its ability to be undertaken in small spaces makes therapeutic horticulture an attractive option for smaller facilities. An extensive systematic review with meta-analysis examined the effectiveness of horticultural therapy. A significant positive association with gardening was observed for a wide range of health outcomes, such as reductions in depression and anxiety symptoms, stress, mood disturbance, and BMI, as well as increases in quality of life, sense of community, physical activity levels, and cognitive function. A systematic review and meta-analysis of research comparing horticultural therapy with usual care and other non-pharmacological interventions for individuals with dementia found that participating in certain types of horticultural therapy activities appeared to improve cognitive functioning, agitation, positive emotion and engagement scores when compared to usual care and other non-pharmacological interventions.

Social Horticultural Therapy 
Social Horticultural Therapy is focused on leisure activity and enhancement of life quality. Unlike therapeutic horticultural therapy, social horticultural therapy is more likely to be activity based. Social Horticulture therapy works to create a community that focuses on plant growth and teaches self-reliance all while providing a support system.

Another element of social horticultural knowledge and expertise is to advise patients and the general public how different herbs and spices can be added to their meals to give flavour and to cure minor ailments. If the varies herbs and edible food crops and plants are planted in their gardens. The patient and or their family can go and pick the varies herbs to add to their meals. Carers with horticultural knowledge and expertise can advise their patients and their families which herbs can be used for different dishes, and advise what other ingredients would work well with these dishes.

See also

 Allied health professions
 Alternative medicine 
 Art therapy
 Care farming
 Ecopsychology
 Forest bathing 
 Green Gym
 Integrative therapies
 List of therapies
 Phytoncide
 Movement/dance therapy
 Sensory garden
 Therapeutic garden
 Serene Oasis
 Occupational therapy
Nature therapy

References

External links
 Kansas State University Horticultural Therapy 
 Nazareth College Horticultural Therapy Program
 Delaware Valley University Horticultural Therapy Program
 Colorado State University Horticultural Therapy Program

Occupational therapy
Horticulture
Rehabilitation medicine
Biophilia hypothesis